Heterotaxis sessilis is an epiphytic orchid widespread across the West Indies (Cuba, Hispaniola, Jamaica, Trinidad), Central America (all 7 countries), southern Mexico (Chiapas, Veracruz, Oaxaca, Quintana Roo), Florida and northern South America (Colombia, Ecuador, Peru, northern Brazil, Venezuela, the Guianas). Hidden orchid is a common name.

The species was long called by the synonym Maxillaria crassifolia but recent molecular studies have indicated that Maxillaria should be split into several genera.

References

External links
Swiss Orchid Foundation at Herbarium Jany Renz, Heterotaxis sessilis 
IOSPE orchid photos, Maxillaria crassifolia (Lindl.) Reichb.f. 1854, Photos courtesy of © Danny Lentz, plant grown by the Atlanta Botanical Garden
Dave's Garden, PlantFiles: Picture #1 of Species Orchid, Hidden Orchid, Thick Leaved Heterotaxis (Heterotaxis sessilis)

Epiphytic orchids
Orchids of the Caribbean
Orchids of Central America
Orchids of Belize
Orchids of South America
Orchids of Cuba
Flora of Florida
Flora of Mexico
Plants described in 1788
Flora without expected TNC conservation status